Collomeninae is a subfamily of the moth family Nolidae. The subfamily was erected by Reza Zahiri, J. Donald Lafontaine and B. Christian Schmidt in 2012.

Genera 
 Algonia Möschler, 1886
 Collomena Möschler, 1890 - South America
 Concana Walker, [1858]
 Clettharina Hampson, 1894 - Southeast Asia
 Eucalypta Hampson, 1912
 Gadirtha Walker, 1858 - Southeast Asia
 synonym Scolopocneme - type: Scolopocneme bufonia C. Felder & R. Felder, 1862
 Iscadia Walker, 1857 - Southeast Asia
 Lophosema Schaus, 1910
 Sebagena Walker, 1865
 Triorbis Hampson, 1894 - Southeast Asia

References

External links

Collomeninae
Moth subfamilies